Stephen Gawthorpe (born 4 July 1958) is a British judoka.  He competed in the men's half-lightweight event at the 1984 Summer Olympics. In 1981, he became champion of Great Britain, winning the featherweight category at the British Judo Championships.

References

1958 births
Living people
British male judoka
Olympic judoka of Great Britain
Judoka at the 1984 Summer Olympics
Sportspeople from Barnsley